Minuscule 626 (in the Gregory-Aland numbering), α 1010 (von Soden), is a Greek minuscule manuscript of the New Testament, on parchment. Palaeographically it has been assigned to the 10th century. The manuscript is lacunose. Tischendorf labeled it by 159a.

Description 

The codex contains the text of the Acts, Epistle of James, and First Epistle of Peter on 84 parchment leaves (size ), with lacunae (Acts 1:1-5:29; 6:14-7:11). The text is written in one column per page, 22 lines per page.

Scholia, whose authors' names are given, were added by a later hand.

Text 

The Greek text of the codex is a representative of the Byzantine text-type. Aland placed it in Category V.

History 

Formerly it was known as Basilian 7. The manuscript was added to the list of New Testament manuscripts by Johann Martin Augustin Scholz, who slightly examined the manuscript. Gregory saw the manuscript in 1886.

Formerly it was labeled by 159a. In 1908 Gregory gave the number 626 to it.

The manuscript currently is housed at the Vatican Library (Vat. gr. 1968), at Rome.

See also 

 List of New Testament minuscules
 Biblical manuscript
 Textual criticism

References

Further reading 

 

Greek New Testament minuscules
10th-century biblical manuscripts
Manuscripts of the Vatican Library